Actias uljanae is a moth in the family Saturniidae. It is found in China  (Guangxi, Guangdong, Hunan and Jiangxi).

References

uljanae
Moths described in 2007
Moths of Asia